is the title of two Japanese animated films. The first was directed by Tomoharu Katsumata and released on Japanese television on February 7, 1981.  It was 68 minutes long, and its official title did not include the exclamation mark on the end.

The second, with the exclamation mark, was a 107-minute remake of the first and was released on July 25, 1992.  It featured direction and screenplay by Masaaki Osumi, music by Kazumasa Oda, art by Hiroyuki Okiura and Satoshi Kon, and background art by Hiroshi Ohno.

The first film was produced by Toei and the second by Visual 80, and both were based on the original short story written by Osamu Dazai in 1940.

Plot
The story takes places in 360 BC and tells the tale of Melos, a Greek country man who is arrested and accused of conspiracy against the king. He gets three days to travel to his sister's wedding while Selinentius (Selinae), a brilliant sculptor who Melos just met, stays as a hostage. As opposed to Osamu Dazai's original story, Melos is here innocent of the conspiracy accusation.

Cast for the 1992 film
Aki Mizusawa as Queen Phryne.
Akiji Kobayashi as  Dionysius II.
Akina Nakamori as  Raisa, Selinentius' lover.
Kōichi Kitamura as Village Chief.
Kōichi Yamadera as Melos.
Megumi Hayashibara as Clea, Melos' sister
Shinji Ogawa as Selinentius.
Takeshi Aono as Calippus.
Takuma Gōno as Pipor.

See also
List of animated feature films

References

External links
 
 
 
 
 Hashire Melos at the Big Cartoon Database
 A trailer of  Hashire Melos at French animation focused website Catsuka

1981 anime films
1992 anime films
Adventure anime and manga
Animated adventure films
Animated drama films
Anime films based on novels
Drama anime and manga
Anime film remakes
Animated films based on classical mythology
Films based on short fiction
Films based on works by Friedrich Schiller
Japanese adventure drama films
1990s Japanese-language films
Toei Animation films